Sulfozinum (sulfozin) is a pharmaceutical drug that causes a pyrogenic reaction (body temperature elevation)  and severe pain. Sulfozinum is a 0.37 - 2% sterilized solution of purified elemental sulfur in peach oil or olive oil for intramuscular injections. The preparation is unstable, so it was prepared only in local hospital pharmacies. In the Soviet Union, it was used in the pyrogenic treatment of syphilitic encephalitis (mostly in the pre-antibiotics era), various psychiatric conditions, and alcoholism. Sulfozin was not used in American psychiatry.

The American delegation during its visit to the USSR in 1989 confirmed charges of the use of sulfozine injections. Psychiatrists in the USSR employed sulfozine treatment allegedly to increase treatment response to neuroleptic administration but were unable to present any research evidence of its efficiency for this purpose. The muscle necrosis, fever, immobility, and severe pain caused by sulfozine, as well as the pattern of its use in 10 persons, suggest that the medication was applied for punitive rather than therapeutic purposes.

Real benefits of its use in psychiatry are disputable, but it was widely used due to its extremely painful action, lasting from several hours to 2–3 days, as a punishment for psychiatric patients and in political abuse of psychiatry. Sulfozine symbolised Soviet punitive psychiatry.

In 1989, during Perestroika, its use was restricted only to cases when its prescription was confirmed both by consilium and by informed consent of the patient or his representatives. Its present use is not known.

In post-Soviet Russia 
Some psychiatrists in post-Soviet Russia call the criticism of sulfozin attacks on psychiatry and still believe that sulfozin was sometimes the only effective treatment when all other ones were ineffective in calming down violent patients. The psychiatrists say that sulfozin really brought a psychosis to remission.

References

Psychopharmacology
Political abuse of psychiatry in the Soviet Union
Drugs in the Soviet Union
Russian drugs
History_of_psychiatry